Acrolepiopsis incertella is a moth of the family Acrolepiidae. It is found in the eastern half of North America, from southern Ontario to Florida and Mississippi in the south and to Illinois and Michigan in the west.

The length of the forewings 4.3–6 mm.

The larvae feed on the young leaves of Smilax species, including Smilax tamnoides and Smilax herbacea. Each larva ties together the margins of one of the terminal leaves of the host plant, to make a shelter. The larva lives and feeds as a skeletonizer inside this shelter. It is thought the larvae complete development and pupate in the shelter, and then emerge in late May or early June.

References

Moths described in 1872
Acrolepiidae